The second USS Thistle (SP-1058) was a United States Navy patrol vessel in commission from 1917 to 1918.

Thistle was built as a private wooden-hulled motorboat of the same name in 1907 by the New York Yacht, Launch & Engine Company at Morris Heights in the Bronx, New York. On 17 August 1917, the U.S. Navy acquired her from her owner, William Emmerich of New York City, for use as a section patrol boat during World War I. She was commissioned as USS Thistle (SP-1058) on 26 December 1917.

Assigned to the 3rd Naval District, Thistle patrolled the coast and harbors between New London, Connecticut, and Barnegat, New Jersey.

Ultimately, Thistle was found to be unsuitable for naval service. On 6 July 1918, the Commandant, 3rd Naval District, ordered her to be returned to Emmerich.

Notes

References

NavSource Online: Section Patrol Craft Photo Archive Thistle (SP 1058)

Patrol vessels of the United States Navy
World War I patrol vessels of the United States
Ships built in Morris Heights, Bronx
1907 ships
Ships built by the New York Yacht, Launch & Engine Company